Cannock Chase Hospital is a community hospital in Cannock Chase, Staffordshire. It is managed by Royal Wolverhampton NHS Trust.

History
The facility has its origins in an infirmary built for the Cannock Chase Workhouse in 1870. The infirmary was completely rebuilt in 1902. This facility joined the National Health Service in 1948 as Chase Hospital. The current hospital, which replaced the aging Chase Hospital and was managed by Mid Staffordshire NHS Trust, was completed in 1991. In October 2014 it was announced that Cannock Chase Hospital would be transferred to the management  of the Royal Wolverhampton NHS Trust.

References

External links
Official site

NHS hospitals in England
Hospitals in Staffordshire
Hospital buildings completed in 1991